Puerto Rico v. Branstad, 483 U.S. 219 (1987), was a case decided by the Supreme Court of the United States that ruled unanimously that federal courts have the power to enforce extraditions based on the Extradition Clause of Article Four of the United States Constitution. The decision overruled a prior decision in Kentucky v. Dennison, which had made federal courts powerless to order governors of other U.S. states to fulfill their obligations in the Extradition Clause.

Background
The Extradition Clause, in Article IV, Section 2, of the United States Constitution reads:

A Person charged in any State with Treason, Felony, or other Crime, who shall flee from Justice, and be found in another State, shall on demand of the executive Authority of the State from which he fled, be delivered up, to be removed to the State having Jurisdiction of the Crime.

Congress also legislated the Extradition Act, which effectively reads the same as the Extradition Clause except to include territories, districts, and states as well.

The Supreme Court had held in Kentucky v. Dennison (1861), before the American Civil War, that the federal courts may not issue writs of mandamus to compel state governors to surrender fugitives.

On 25 January 1981, Iowa native Ronald Calder struck a Puerto Rican couple, Antonio de Jesus and his wife Amy Villalba de Jesus, with his car in a grocery store parking lot near Aguadilla, Puerto Rico, following what was reportedly a dispute over scraped fenders. Antonio de Jesus survived the attack but Amy, who was eight months pregnant, died shortly afterwards. Witnesses testified that Calder, after striking the couple, backed his car two or three times over the victim's body. Calder claimed that de Jesus had threatened him with an iron bar and that he had accidentally run over de Jesus's wife whilst attempting to flee.

Calder was arrested and charged with first-degree homicide by Puerto Rican authorities and was released after paying $5,000 bail. However, Calder did not appear at two preliminary hearings that were scheduled in the Puerto Rico District Courts, and he was then declared a fugitive of justice. The Puerto Rican authorities notified the police in Iowa because they had suspicions that he had fled to his home state. In April 1981, Calder surrendered to the police in Polk County, Iowa, but was released after he had posted the $20,000 bail that had been set by an Iowa District Court magistrate.

In May 1981, the governor of Puerto Rico, Carlos Romero Barceló, submitted to the governor of Iowa, Robert D. Ray, a request for extradition. The request for extradition was referred to an extradition hearing at which Calder's counsel testified that "a white American man could not receive a fair trial in the Commonwealth of Puerto Rico."

After failed attempts were made to negotiate a reduction in charges against Calder, Ray wrote, in December 1981, to Barceló that in the absence of a "change to a more realistic charge," the request for extradition was denied. Another extradition request was made to Ray's successor, Terry Branstad, but was also denied.

In February 1984, the Commonwealth of Puerto Rico filed a petition for a writ of mandamus in the United States District Court for the Southern District of Iowa to order Branstad to proceed with the extradition of Calder. Branstad argued that the Extradition Clause did not apply to Puerto Rico because the island was not a U.S. state. Furthermore, he claimed that Puerto Rico could not invoke the Extradition Act because the federal courts, under Kentucky v. Dennison, did not have the power to order governors to follow the Extradition Clause or Act. The District Court agreed and dismissed the case. The United States Court of Appeals for the Eighth Circuit affirmed.

Decision
Justice Marshall delivered the Court's opinion. It concluded that the precedent established by Kentucky v. Dennison was "the product of another time. The conception of the relation between the States and the Federal Government there announced is fundamentally incompatible with more than a century of constitutional development."

The Supreme Court, therefore, established the power of federal courts to enforce both the Extradition Clause and the Extradition Act by writs of mandamus.

One point that arose during oral argument was whether the Extradition Clause applied to Puerto Rico since it is not a U.S. state. Although Justice Marshall, joined by five other Justices, analyzed Puerto Rico's current political condition as one that gives Puerto Rico certain rights comparable to those of the U.S. states, he applied in the end the Extradition Act, which clearly includes U.S. territories. Justice O'Connor noted that fact in her concurrence and did not join the opinion of the Court regarding Puerto Rico's status.

Justice Scalia also did not join that section of the opinion and noted that "no party before us has asserted the lack of power of Congress to require extradition from a State to a Territory."

The decision effectively overruled Kentucky v. Dennison and reversed the judgments of the Eighth Circuit and the Southern District of Iowa.

Aftermath

Following the ruling, Calder voluntarily returned to Puerto Rico in September 1987 to face charges of murder and attempted murder. These were dismissed by the trial judge and Calder instead pleaded guilty in January 1988 to voluntary manslaughter and attempted manslaughter. He was given 16 and 5-year suspended sentences and permitted to return to Iowa on 15-years' probation. After his return, he was rehired by the Federal Aviation Administration and worked there until his retirement. He died in May 2015 in Des Moines, aged 75.

See also

 List of United States Supreme Court cases, volume 483
 List of United States Supreme Court cases
 Lists of United States Supreme Court cases by volume
 List of United States Supreme Court cases by the Rehnquist Court
 Rendition
 Federalism

References

External links
 

United States Supreme Court cases
United States Supreme Court cases of the Rehnquist Court
United States Supreme Court decisions that overrule a prior Supreme Court decision
Extradition Clause case law
1987 in United States case law
Legal history of Puerto Rico
Legal history of Iowa